{{Infobox ethnic group
|group=Roaring Creek Rancheria
|total=1800 Pit River Indians,14 living on rancheria<ref name=sdsu>"Roaring Creek Rancheria." SDSU: California Indians and their Reservations." Retrieved 20 April 2013.</ref>
|popplace=
|rels=traditional tribal religion, Christianity
|langs=English
|related=other Pit River Indians
}}

The Roaring Creek Rancheria is a federal Indian reservation belonging to Achumawi and Atsugewi members of the Pit River Tribe, a federally recognized tribe of indigenous people of California. The ranchería is located in Shasta County in north-central California.

Established in 1915, Roaring Creek Rancheria is  large and is located 43 miles northeast of Redding, California. More locally, it lies about 5 miles northwest of the unincorporated community of Montgomery Creek.

Education
The ranchería is served by the Mountain Union Elementary School District and the Shasta Union High School District.

Notes

References
 Pritzker, Barry M. A Native American Encyclopedia: History, Culture, and Peoples.'' Oxford: Oxford University Press, 2000. .

External links
 Pit River Tribe, official website

Pit River tribes
Populated places in Shasta County, California
American Indian reservations in California
Native American tribes in California
Federally recognized tribes in the United States